Nadasi Kasa (also Nadasi Akasa, Nadadi Akasa,  or Nada Diaka) was a queen of the Saka Mahakshatrapa Rajuvula, daughter of Aiyasi Kamuia. She finds mention in inscription  no A-5 of the Mathura Lion Capital.
F. W. Thomas has read this name as Nadadi (Nadasi)- Akasa, Dr  Bühler however, has read it as Nadasia Kasaye, but  Sten Konow, on the other hand, reads it as Nada Diaka.

See also
Kamuia
Arta
Aiyasi Kamuia
Kharaosta Kamuio or Kharahostes
Maues
Rajuvula

References and notes

Indo-Scythian peoples
Queens consort
Ancient Indian women
1st-century BC Indian people
1st-century BC women